The Russia women's national handball team is the national team of the Russian Federation. It is governed by the Handball Union of Russia and takes part in international handball competitions.

They are as of October 2021, together with its predecessor the USSR team, the only handball teams on the women's and men's side in the world, to have won the World Championship three consecutive times. Overall, the team won three medals at the Olympics, with a gold on 2016, five medals at the World Championships, with four of them gold, and four medals at the European Championships, with two silvers in 2006 and 2018.

In reaction to the 2022 Russian invasion of Ukraine, the International Handball Federation banned Russian and Belarusian athletes and officials, and the European Handball Federation suspended the national teams of Russia and Belarus, as well as Russian and Belarusian clubs competing in European handball competitions. Referees, officials, and commission members from Russia and Belarus will not be called upon for future activities, and new organisers will be sought for the YAC 16 EHF Beach Handball EURO and the Qualifier Tournaments for the Beach Handball EURO 2023, which were to be held in Moscow.

History

1993–1999: Instability
The Russian women's national handball team was formed in 1993, succeeding the Soviet Union women's national handball team, one of the strongest teams in the world. Notwithstanding the third place at the 1992 Summer Olympics as the Unified Team, Russia could not qualify for the Olympic Games in the following eight years.

In this period the Russian team saw four changes of coaches, who retired after failing on large events. The only striking performance was at the 1997 World Women's Handball Championship, where Russia under Igor Eskov, coach of the Rostov club Istochnik, became 4th, and two Russian handball players, Natalya Malakhova and Natalya Deryugina, were included into the All-Star team. However, already in the next year at the 1998 European Women's Handball Championship in the Netherlands, Russia became only 9th, and at the 1999 World Women's Handball Championship, under Kuban's Alexander Tarasikov and head coach of the Unified Team at the 1992 Olympics, just 12th.

1999–2009: Breakthrough
In late 1999, Tarasikov was replaced by Evgeny Trefilov, the club coach of Lada. He introduced younger players to the national team and concentrated more on national club players. At the 2000 European Championship, Russia became bronze medalists.

At the 2001 World Championship, Trefilov returned two veterans, Raisa Verakso, which was her sixth participation at Worlds, and the 1990 World champion, goalkeeper Svetlana Bogdanova. Russia won all nine matches, and in the final defeated Norway.

Against the backgrounds of those victories, Team Russia became 4th at the 2002 European Championship in Denmark, and a year later at the World Championship in Croatia they became only 7th, which meant that Trefilov's team could not qualify for the 2004 Olympic Games. Only one point was needed to reach the semi-finals in Croatia, but Russia failed to do that against France in the group stage, losing 19–20; a draw would have been enough to qualify.

After the fourth-best result at the 2004 European Championship in Hungary, Team Russia rose from the ashes at the 2005 World Championship in Saint Petersburg, repeating the 2001 success in Italy.

Russia lost in the final of the 2006 European Championship to Norway, and so could not directly qualify for the Olympics; however, Russia rematched Norway at the 2007 World Championship in France in the final. A number of top handball players such as Lyudmila Bodnieva, MVP of the previous World championships and member of the All-Star Team at the 2000 and 2006 European championships, Irina Bliznova, who was injured in the group stage, Natalya Shipilova, who could not compete in the semi-finals. Goal keeper Inna Suslina made a great game, saving three out of five penalties. Russia won 29–24.

Norway returned the favour at the 2008 Olympics in the gold medal game. Already in the early stage leading ten balls, the Vikings hindered the Russians coming back, and so Russia lost 34–27. Russia won silver.

After the Olympic Games, Anna Kareeva, Oksana Romenskaya and Natalya Shipilova decided to retire from handball. Prior to the 2008 European Championship in Macedonia, players such as Polina Vyakhireva, Yana Uskova, Ekaterina Andryushina, Lyudmila Postnova and Irina Bliznova could not compete for Russia due to injuries or disease; they were replaced by nine debutants. Russia again met Norway in the semi-finals, and as previously, the Scandinavians started well, leading 7–1 in the beginning. In the third-place match between Germany, Russia claimed bronze.

The Russians defeated the Norwegians in the semi-final of the 2009 World Championship with a score of 28–20. In the final, Russia claimed the gold medal by defeating France, 25–22.

2009–2013: Decline and Retirement of Trefilov
After the 2009 World Championships, team Russia saw a number of disappointing results. They became 7th at the 2010 European Championship and 6th at the 2011 World Championship. Russia could not get beyond the quarterfinal of the 2012 Olympics, losing there to South Korea. After the London Olympics, the new head coach became Vitaly Krokhin.

In June 2013, Russia fought for the qualification to the World Championship. In the playoff round, Russia won the first leg in Rotterdam, 27–26, but lost the next leg in Rostov-on-Don, 21–33. With that said, Russia for the first time did not qualify for the Worlds.

2013–19: Trefilov's Return and Olympic Gold
On 16 September 2013, Evgeny Trefilov returned as head coach. He debuted at the 2014 European Championship, but Russia became a dreadful 14th, the worst ever result in the European championships. However, on 7 and 13 June 2015, Russia twice defeated Germany in the playoffs and qualified for the 2015 World Championship. In their first match they defeated the Norwegians, 26–25. However, the Russians only reached the quarterfinals, losing there to Poland. In the playoffs, team Russia was placed 5th.

Russia qualified to the Olympics for the third time, through the qualification tournament taking place from 18 to 20 March 2016 in Astrakhan. In the group stage of the Olympic tournament, Russia defeated all of its rivals. In the knockout stage, the Russians defeated Angola in the quarterfinal, and in the marathon semi-final match between Norway claimed the deciding point in overtime. In the final, Russia defeated France to claim its first Olympic gold in women's handball.

At the 2018 European Championships, the last time under the guidance of Trefilov, Russia broke through the final for the first time since 2006. Russia lost to host France, who took its first championship title.

2019–20: Ambros Martin as new head coach
In August 2019, national team's head coach Trefliov was replaced by Rostov-Don's Ambros Martin. Trefilov took the post as vice-president of the Handball Federation of Russia. Team Russia entered the 2019 World Championships as the main favourite. The squad, primarily including 20 players, was reduced to 18 players; injured Antonina Skorobogatchenko and alternate Olga Shcherbak were dismissed. The Russian team, after winning eight matches in a row was eventually defeated by the Dutch in the semi-finals by a one-point difference, which happened after a last-minute shot in the second half, leaving a final result of 32–33 for Russia against the Netherlands. Russia went on to win the bronze match against Norway, 33–28; this was the first time since 2009 that the Russians won a medal at the Worlds.

Russia went to the 2020 Europeans with less optimism; three injured top players – Elena Mikhaylichenko, Anna Sen and Anna Viakhireva – had to skip the championships; reduced team practice sessions of only one week, for the first time taking place in a sports school hall; missing test matches due to the worldwide situation imposed by the COVID-19 outbreak. Russia started well on the Championships, finishing first in its group in the preliminary round. In the main round, the Russians defeated Montenegro, played a draw match against France and lost against Denmark. As a result, they did not qualify for the semifinals. Martin decided to retire from his position as head coach, expressing his will to focus on family life instead.

2021: Alekseyev replaces Martin
After Martin retired in December 2020, Lada's Alexey Alekseyev, who previously served as assistant coach for the national team and was the head coach of Luch, replaced the Spaniard. Furthermore, the coaching staff was renewed, now featuring former handball player Olga Akopyan and Rostov-Don's assistant coach Tomáš Hlavatý. Also, Trefilov took the position as consultant. Prior to the Tokyo's 2020 Summer Olympics, which were postponed to July–August 2021 due to the COVID-19 pandemic, team Russia went through the Hungarian leg of the qualification tournament, which took place Győr. Two of four participating teams were granted a ticket to the upcoming Olympics. Russia won all three matches against Serbia, Kazakhstan and Hungary.

The squad for the Olympics was announced on 2 June. Prior to the Olympics, on 26 June Russia played a friendly match against the Netherlands in Japan. A week later they played another friendly match, losing a second time to the Dutch team. Goalkeeper Anastasia Lagina and outside left Daria Samokhina were named alternates. The team lost its opening Olympic match to Sweden, then drew Hungary, and after that went on a five-match winning streak all the way to the gold medal game, beating Norway in the semi-finals by one point, just as they did in 2016. And just as in 2016, Russia faced France in the final. This time, the French prevailed, 30–25, but Russia won silver, its third Olympic medal after Soviet collapse.

On 23 September 2021, Lyudmila Bodniyeva was announced as the team's new head coach, after Alekseyev's contract ran out.

2022: Suspension from international competition
In reaction to the 2022 Russian invasion of Ukraine, the International Handball Federation banned Russian and Belarusian athletes and officials, and the European Handball Federation suspended the national teams of Russia and Belarus as well as Russian and Belarusian clubs competing in European handball competitions. Referees, officials, and commission members from Russia and Belarus will not be called upon for future activities, and new organisers will be sought for the YAC 16 EHF Beach Handball EURO and the Qualifier Tournaments for the Beach Handball EURO 2023, which were to be held in Moscow.

Results

Honours

Olympic Games

World Championship

European Championship

Other tournaments
 Carpathian Trophy 1995 – Second place
 Carpathian Trophy 1997 – Second place
 Carpathian Trophy 2000 – Winner
 Møbelringen Cup 2001 – Winner
 Carpathian Trophy 2002 – Third place
 Møbelringen Cup 2004 – Third place
 Møbelringen Cup 2005 – Second place
 Møbelringen Cup 2006 – Second place
 Møbelringen Cup 2007 – Second place
 Møbelringen Cup 2008 – Second place
 Møbelringen Cup 2009 – Second place
 Møbelringen Cup 2015 – Winner
 Møbelringen Cup 2017 – Second place
 Carpathian Trophy 2018 – Third place

Team

Current squad
Squad for the 2021 World Women's Handball Championship.

Head coach: Lyudmila Bodniyeva

Notable players
Several Russian players have seen their individual performance recognized at international tournaments, either as Most Valuable Player, best defense player or as a member of the All-Star Team.
MVP
Liudmila Bodnieva, 2005 World Championship
Liudmila Postnova, 2009 World Championship
Anna Vyakhireva, 2016 and 2020 Summer Olympics; 2018 European Championship
All-Star Team
Natalya Deryugina, 1995 and 1997 World Championship
Natalia Malakhova, 1997 World Championship
Irina Poltoratskaya, 2001 World Championship
Liudmila Bodnieva, 2001 and 2005 World Championship; 2002, 2004 and 2006 European Championship
Inna Suslina, 2006 European Championship; 2009 World Championship
Yana Uskova, 2007 World Championship
Liudmila Postnova, 2008 Summer Olympics
Irina Bliznova, 2008 Summer Olympics
Polina Kuznetsova, 2007 World Championship; 2012 European Championship; 2016 and 2020 Summer Olympics
Emiliya Turey, 2011 World Championship
Daria Dmitrieva, 2016 Summer Olympics
Anna Vyakhireva, 2019 World Championship; 2020 Summer Olympics
Best defense player
Nadezda Muravyeva, 2008 European Championship

Coaching history

See also
Russia men's national handball team
Soviet Union women's national handball team
Soviet Union men's national handball team

References

External links

IHF profile

National team
Handball
Women's national handball teams